As an acronym, BLS may stand for:

Companies and brands
BellSouth, ticker symbol for the defunct United States  telephone company
BLS AG, a railway company in Switzerland once called Bern-Lötschberg-Simplon railway
Cadillac BLS, a compact executive car.

Education
Bachelor of Liberal Studies
Bachelor of Library Science
Boston Latin School, the first school established in North America
Brooklyn Law School
Bucerius Law School, the first private law school in Germany

Science and medicine
Bacterial leaf scorch, a disease state affecting many crops
Bare lymphocyte syndrome, a form of severe combined immunodeficiency
Basic life support, an emergency medical protocol
Blind loop syndrome, small intestinal bacterial overgrowth
Brillouin Scattering (or Brillouin Light Scattering)
BLS digital signature, a cryptographic signature fo verifying that a system validated a transaction

Other uses
Buckeye Leadership Society, an honorary leadership Society at The Ohio State University
Bureau of Labor Statistics, a United States government agency
Black Label Society, an American heavy metal band

See also
WBLS, a New York radio station